Skantebygda is a village in Rakkestad municipality, Norway, located in the agricultural area west of Rakkestad village.

References

Villages in Østfold